Rami Al Ali (born in Deir ez-Zor) is a Syrian-born fashion designer.

Early life and career 
He is the son of architect Ghassan and mother Sameeha, a graduate in Middle Eastern history, grew up in Deir ez-Zor, Syria. Al Ali took an early interest in fashion. He moved to Damascus and joined the College of Fine Arts in 1991 to study Visual Communications. This led to his experimentation with creative pursuits in subjects such as interior and graphic design. In 1995 Al Ali designed and produced a fashion show for his final graduation presentation.

Rami Al Ali’s next move was to the United Arab Emirates where in 2001 the Rami Al Ali Couture brand was founded.

Rami Al Ali's work garnered attention from global brands such as Swarovski when he was  featured in Unbridled, a book published by the global Austrian crystal brand, with others like Giorgio Armani, Vivienne Westwood and John Galliano. In 2009, Al Ali was invited as a guest member of Alta Moda Alta Roma, showing his Spring-Summer Couture collection on the official couture week calendar.

In 2009, Rami Al Ali was named among the top 50 influential Arabs by Middle-East Magazine.

Collections 
In January 2012, Rami Al Ali launched his first couture collection in Paris showcasing his Spring-Summer 2012 collection. He continues to showcase two couture collections annually in the French capital. His latest couture collection was in January 2023 in Paris. 

In 2014, Rami Al Ali launched his ready-to-wear collection. 

In 2020, Rami Al Ali launched Rami Al Ali White. The collection is an annual edition of ready-to-wear evening and bridal designs that prioritize longevity.

Notable clients 
Notable clients of Rami Al Ali include:

Initiatives Rami Al Ali participated 
In 2017, Rami Al Ali started a mentorship program known as ESMOD Fashion Institute in Dubai for young designers. In 2019, participated in the Atassi Foundation exhibition in Dubai to advocated for women’s art movement in Syria, emphasizing the immense role female artists played in shaping the nation’s art scene. He also collaborated with Dubai Design & Fashion Council (DDFC) as a Mentor to elevate talent in the Emirate and support the development of a sustainable industry. Rami Al Ali launched the community initiative ‘Ard Dyar’, a movement assist emerging Syrian talent.

References 

Year of birth missing (living people)
People from Deir ez-Zor
Living people
Syrian fashion designers